Georges Jean Marie Darrieus (24 September 1888 – 15 July 1979) was a French aeronautical engineer in the 20th century. He is perhaps most famous for his invention of the Darrieus rotor, a wind turbine capable of operating from any direction and under adverse weather conditions, and the vertical-axis giromill.

The invention is described in the 1931 .

See also
Darrieus–Landau instability

External links
academie-sciences.fr 
US patent 1,835,018

French aerospace engineers
Members of the French Academy of Sciences
20th-century French inventors
Wind turbines
1888 births
1979 deaths
Fluid dynamicists